Samuel Ferrior (177218 June 1815) was a British soldier killed at the Battle of Waterloo on 18June 1815.

Career
Born in Pembrokeshire, he was promoted to Captain in the 1st Life Guards on 1August 1802. On 30June 1810 he was promoted from captain to major by purchase
and subsequently to lieutenant-colonel.

At the Battle of Waterloo, the 1st Life Guards formed part of the 1st (or household) brigade of heavy cavalry under Major-General Lord Edward Somerset.

Records suggest that during the battle, as major and Lieutenant-colonel he led his regiment in eleven charges, most of which were not made until after "his head had been laid open by the cut of a sabre and his body was pierced with a lance".

References

1772 births
1815 deaths
British military personnel killed in action in the Napoleonic Wars
British Life Guards officers
People from Pembrokeshire
Military personnel from Pembrokeshire